The National Assembly is the lower house of the bicameral Parliament of the Republic of the Congo. It has 151 members, elected for five-year terms in single-seat constituencies.

Colonial elections 
1946–47
1952
1957

Post-colonial elections 
1959
1963
1973
1979
1984
1989
1992
1993
2002
2007
2012
2017
2022

See also 
 List of presidents of the National Assembly of the Republic of the Congo
 Pierre Passi

Notes

References 

Congo
Government of the Republic of the Congo
1958 establishments in the Republic of the Congo